Milford High School & Applied Technology Center is a grade 9-12 high school in the Milford School District located in Milford, New Hampshire.

Athletics
The school competes at the Division II level. School teams include football, cheer, cross country, golf, soccer field hockey, basketball, volleyball, wrestling, swimming, indoor track, gymnastics, ice hockey, tennis, baseball, softball, lacrosse, and lastly track and field.

Notable alumni
 Morgan Andrews, soccer player
 Erland Van Lidth De Jeude, actor and amateur wrestler
 Lisa Biron, Attorney and convicted sex offender. Sentenced to 40 years in prison for sex trafficking and sexual exploitation.

References

External links
 

Public high schools in New Hampshire
Schools in Hillsborough County, New Hampshire